The men's 100 metres at the 1958 European Athletics Championships was held in Stockholm, Sweden, at Stockholms Olympiastadion on 19 and 20 August 1958.

Medalists

Results

Final
20 August
Wind: 1.5 m/s

Semi-finals
20 August

Semi-final 1
Wind: 0.6 m/s

Semi-final 2
Wind: 1.2 m/s

Semi-final 3
Wind: 0.8 m/s

Heats
19 August

Heat 1
Wind: 1.1 m/s

Heat 2
Wind: 0.3 m/s

Heat 3
Wind: 0.5 m/s

Heat 4
Wind: 1 m/s

Heat 5
Wind: 2 m/s

Heat 6
Wind: 1.3 m/s

Participation
According to an unofficial count, 29 athletes from 18 countries participated in the event.

 (2)
 (1)
 (1)
 (2)
 (1)
 (2)
 (1)
 (2)
 (1)
 (2)
 (1)
 (2)
 (2)
 (2)
 (2)
 (1)
 (2)
 (2)

References

100 metres
100 metres at the European Athletics Championships